Ravnogor Peak is the rocky, partly ice-free peak rising to 937 m in southeastern Poibrene Heights on Oscar II Coast, Graham Land in Antarctica.

The feature is named after the settlement of Ravnogor in southern Bulgaria.

Location

Maps
 Antarctic Digital Database (ADD). Scale 1:250000 topographic map of Antarctica. Scientific Committee on Antarctic Research (SCAR). Since 1993, regularly upgraded and updated.

Notes

References
 Ravnogor Peak. SCAR Composite Antarctic Gazetteer.
 Bulgarian Antarctic Gazetteer. Antarctic Place-names Commission. (details in Bulgarian, basic data in English)

External links
 Ravnogor Peak. Copernix satellite image

Mountains of Graham Land
Oscar II Coast
Bulgaria and the Antarctic